Events from the year 1685 in Ireland.

Incumbent
Monarch: Charles II (until 6 February), then James II

Events
 6 February – James II becomes King of England, Scotland and Ireland upon the death of Charles II.
 1 October – Henry Hyde, 2nd Earl of Clarendon, appointed Lord Lieutenant of Ireland.
 The 4th Royal Irish Dragoon Guards is raised as a cavalry regiment of the British Army, the Earl of Arran's Regiment of Cuirassiers, by the regimenting of various independent troops, and ranked as the 6th Regiment of Horse.

Publications
August? – the News-letter first published in Dublin.
Rev. William Bedell's Old Testament translation into Irish, transcribed by Uilliam Ó Duinnín and revised by Rev. Narcissus Marsh with the aid of Jesuit scholars Andrew Sall and Paul Higgins and scientist Robert Boyle, is published posthumously in London in a new typeface designed by Sall and made by Joseph Moxon.
Ruaidhrí Ó Flaithbheartaigh semi-mythical history of Ireland, Ogygia: seu Rerum Hibernicarum Chronologia & etc., is published.
Sir William Petty's Hiberniae Delineatio, the first printed atlas of Ireland (based on his Down Survey of 1655–6) is published.

Births

11 March – William Flower, 1st Baron Castle Durrow, politician (d.1746).
12 March – Bishop George Berkeley, philosopher and writer (d.1753).
Samuel Haliday, Presbyterian minister (d.1739).
Henry Ponsonby, soldier and politician (d.1745).
approximate date
Henry Colley, politician (d.1723/4).
Alexander Cosby, soldier in Nova Scotia (d.1742).
Edward England, born Edward Seegar, pirate (d.1720/1 in Madagascar)
Nicholas Taaffe, 6th Viscount Taaffe, Graf von Taaffe, soldier (d.1769).

Deaths
17 March – Sir Richard Bulkeley, 1st Baronet, politician (b.1634).
18 March – Francis Harold, Franciscan scholar.
William Alington, 3rd Baron Alington, peer (b. before 1641).
John Eyre, Cromwellian settler and Mayor of Galway.

References

 
1680s in Ireland
Ireland
Years of the 17th century in Ireland